Albert Heijnneman (28 October 1898 – 20 February 1944) was a Dutch sprinter. He competed in the men's 100 metres at the 1920 Summer Olympics. He was part of the Dutch resistance and was tortured to death by the Gestapo.

References

External links
 

1898 births
1944 deaths
Athletes (track and field) at the 1920 Summer Olympics
Dutch male sprinters
Olympic athletes of the Netherlands
Resistance members killed by Nazi Germany
People from Penang
Dutch resistance members
Dutch civilians killed in World War II
Dutch torture victims
People executed by torture
19th-century Dutch people
20th-century Dutch people